The Irish International or Irish Open in badminton is an international open held in Ireland since 1902 and is thereby one of the oldest badminton tournaments in the world. It was however interrupted by the two World Wars. This tournament is currently a part of the European Badminton Circuit and takes place at the end of November every year as part of the home nations loop of international tournaments that include the Scottish Open and the Welsh Open in consecutive weeks. The tournament for most part and in recent years has been an International Challenge rated event. The recent exception was in 2012, 2017 & 2018 when the tournament was downgraded to International Series due to funding. Recent editions have been held in the Baldoyle Badminton Centre except for 2007 and 2011 tournaments which were held in Lisburn, Northern Ireland.

In 2016 the Irish Open moved to the new National Indoor Arena in Blanchardstown, Dublin, as the first ever event in the new state of the art arena before its official opening in January 2017. The December 2017 edition reverted to an International Series level tournament which saw three Irish players/pairs reach the final.

Notable past winners of the Irish Open are Carolina Marin(multiple Olympic and World Champion in women's singles) and multiple All England winner Tina Baun(nee Rasmussen). Marin's win in 2009 was the Spanish player's first senior international win while still a junior.

Past winners

Performances by nation

External links
yonexirishinternational.com

 
1902 establishments in Ireland
Badminton tournaments in Ireland
Recurring sporting events established in 1902